Thripastichus is a genus of hymenopteran insects of the family Eulophidae.

Thripastichus gentilei(Del Guerico) was a parasitoid on thrips species like Rhipipothrips cruentatus and gynaikothrips uzelii on grapes

References
Key to Nearctic eulophid genera
Universal Chalcidoidea Database

Eulophidae